Orthomus is a genus of beetles in the family Carabidae, containing the following species:

 Orthomus abacoides Lucas, 1846
 Orthomus achilles Wrase & Jeanne, 2005
 Orthomus anagae Medina & Oromi, 1991
 Orthomus annae (Donabauer, 2008)
 Orthomus aquila Coquerel, 1859
 Orthomus aubryi Jeanne, 1974
 Orthomus balearicus (Piochard de la Brulerie, 1868)
 Orthomus barbarus Dejean, 1828
 Orthomus bedelianus Lutshnik, 1915
 Orthomus berrai F. Battoni, 1987
 Orthomus berytensis Reiche & Saulcy, 1855
 Orthomus canariensis Brulle, 1839
 Orthomus curtus (Wollaston, 1854)
 Orthomus dilaticollis Wollaston, 1854
 Orthomus dimorphus Antoine, 1933
 Orthomus discors Wollaston, 1864
 Orthomus gonzalezi Mateu, 1954
 Orthomus gracilipes Wollaston, 1854
 Orthomus hispanicus Dejean, 1828
 Orthomus leprieuri Pic, 1894
 Orthomus longulus Reiche & Saulcy, 1855
 Orthomus lundbladi Jeannel, 1938
 Orthomus maroccanus Chaudoir, 1873
 Orthomus martini Machado, 1984
 Orthomus pecoudi Jeannel, 1943
 Orthomus perezii (Martinez y Saez, 1873)
 Orthomus planidorsis (Fairmaire, 1872)
 Orthomus poggii Leo & Magrini, 2002
 Orthomus pommereaui Perris, 1869
 Orthomus rubicundus (Coquerel, 1859)
 Orthomus sidonicus Chaudoir, 1873
 Orthomus starkei Wrase & Jeanne, 2005
 Orthomus szekessyi (Jedlicka, 1956)
 Orthomus tazekensis (Antoine, 1941)
 Orthomus velocissimus Waltl, 1835

References

Pterostichinae